WKDW could refer to:

WKDW (AM), a radio station (900 AM) licensed to Staunton, Virginia, United States
WKDW-LP, a radio station (97.5 FM) licensed to North Port, Florida, United States